It is not clear where and when the crossbow originated, but it is believed to have appeared in China and Europe around the 7th to 5th centuries BC. In China the crossbow was one of the primary military weapons from the Warring States period until the end of the Han dynasty, when armies composed of up to 30 to 50 percent crossbowmen were not unheard of. The crossbow lost much of its popularity after the fall of the Han dynasty, likely due to the rise of the more resilient heavy cavalry during the Six Dynasties. One Tang dynasty source recommends a bow to crossbow ratio of five to one as well as the utilization of the countermarch to make up for the crossbow's lack of speed. The crossbow countermarch technique was further refined in the Song dynasty, but crossbow usage in the military continued to decline after the Mongol conquest of China. Although the crossbow never regained the prominence it once had under the Han, it was never completely phased out either. Even as late as the 17th century, military theorists were still recommending it for wider military adoption, but production had already shifted in favor of firearms and traditional composite bows.

In the Western world a crossbow known as the gastraphetes was described by the Greco-Roman scientist Heron of Alexandria in the 1st century AD. He believed it was the forerunner of the catapult, which places its appearance sometime prior to the 4th century BC during the Classical period. Other than the gastraphetes, the only other evidence of crossbows in ancient Europe are two stone relief carvings from a Roman grave in Gaul and some vague references by Vegetius. Pictish imagery from medieval Scotland dated between the 6th and 9th centuries AD do show what appear to be crossbows, but only for hunting, and not military usage. It's not clear how widespread crossbows were in Europe prior to the medieval period or if they were even used for warfare. The small body of evidence and the context they provide point to the fact that the ancient European crossbow was primarily a hunting tool or minor siege weapon. An assortment of other ancient European bolt throwers exist such as the ballista, but these were torsion engines and are not considered crossbows. Crossbows are not mentioned in European sources again until 947 as a French weapon during the siege of Senlis. From the 11th century onward, crossbows and crossbowmen occupied a position of high status in medieval European militaries, with the exception of the English and their continued use of the longbow. During the 16th century military crossbows in Europe were superseded by gunpowder weaponry such as cannons and muskets. Hunters continued to carry crossbows for another 150 years due to its silence.

There is a theory that medieval European crossbows originate from China but some differences exist between the two trigger mechanisms used in European and Chinese crossbows.

Terminology

A crossbowman or crossbow-maker is sometimes called an arbalist or arbalest.

Arrow, bolt and quarrel are all suitable terms for crossbow projectiles.

The lath, also called the prod, is the bow of the crossbow. According to W.F. Peterson, the prod came into usage in the 19th century as a result of mistranslating rodd in a 16th-century list of crossbow effects.

The stock is the wooden body on which the bow is mounted, although the medieval tiller is also used.

The lock refers to the release mechanism, including the string, sears, trigger lever, and housing.

China

Warring States
In terms of archaeological evidence, crossbow locks made of cast bronze have been found in China dating to around 650 BC. They have also been found in Tombs 3 and 12 at Qufu, Shandong, previously the capital of Lu, and date to 6th century BC. Bronze crossbow bolts dating from the mid-5th century BC have been found at a Chu burial site in Yutaishan, Jiangling County, Hubei Province. Other early finds of crossbows were discovered in Tomb 138 at Saobatang, Hunan Province, and date to mid-4th century BC. It's possible that these early crossbows used spherical pellets for ammunition. A Western-Han mathematician and music theorist, Jing Fang (78-37 BC), compared the moon to the shape of a round crossbow bullet. Zhuangzi also mentions crossbow bullets.

The earliest Chinese documents mentioning a crossbow were texts from the 4th to 3rd centuries BC attributed to the followers of Mozi. This source refers to the use of a giant crossbow between the 6th and 5th centuries BC, corresponding to the late Spring and Autumn Period. Sun Tzu's The Art of War (first appearance dated between 500 BC to 300 BC) refers to the characteristics and use of crossbows in chapters 5 and 12 respectively, and compares a drawn crossbow to 'might.'

The state of Chu favorited elite armoured crossbow units known for their endurance, and were capable of marching 160 km 'without resting.' Wei's elite forces were capable of marching over 40 km in one day while wearing heavy armour, a large crossbow with 50 bolts, a helmet, a side sword, and three days worth of rations. Those who met these standards earned an exemption from corvée labor and taxes for their entire family.

Han dynasty
The Huainanzi advises its readers not to use crossbows in marshland where the surface is soft and it is hard to arm the crossbow with the foot. The Records of the Grand Historian, completed in 94 BC, mentions that Sun Bin defeated Pang Juan by ambushing him with a body of crossbowmen at the Battle of Maling. The Book of Han, finished 111 AD, lists two military treatises on crossbows.

In the 2nd century AD, Chen Yin gave advice on shooting with a crossbow in the Wuyue Chunqiu:

It's clear from surviving inventory lists in Gansu and Xinjiang that the crossbow was greatly favored by the Han dynasty. For example, in one batch of slips there are only two mentions of bows, but thirty mentions of crossbows. Crossbows were mass-produced in state armories with designs improving as time went on, such as the use of a mulberry wood stock and brass; a crossbow in 1068 could pierce a tree at 140 paces. Crossbows were used in numbers as large as 50,000 starting from the Qin dynasty and upwards of several hundred thousand during the Han. According to one authority, the crossbow had become "nothing less than the standard weapon of the Han armies," by the second century BC. Han era carved stone images and paintings also contain images of horsemen wielding crossbows. Han soldiers were required to pull an "entry level" crossbow with a draw-weight of 76 kg to qualify as a crossbowman.

Later history

After the Han dynasty, the crossbow lost favor until it experienced a mild resurgence during the Tang dynasty, under which the ideal expeditionary army of 20,000 included 2,200 archers and 2,000 crossbowmen. Li Jing and Li Quan prescribed 20 percent of the infantry to be armed with standard crossbows, which could hit the target half the time at a distance of 345 meters, but had an effective range of 225 meters.

During the Song dynasty, the government attempted to restrict the spread of military crossbows and sought ways to keep armour and crossbows out of private homes. Despite the ban on certain types of crossbows, the weapon experienced an upsurge in civilian usage as both a hunting weapon and pastime. The "romantic young people from rich families, and others who had nothing particular to do" formed crossbow shooting clubs as a way to pass time.

During the late Ming dynasty, no crossbows were mentioned to have been produced in the three-year period from 1619 to 1622. With 21,188,366 taels, the Ming manufactured 25,134 cannons, 8,252 small guns, 6,425 muskets, 4,090 culverins, 98,547 polearms and swords, 26,214 great "horse decapitator" swords, 42,800 bows, 1,000 great axes, 2,284,000 arrows, 180,000 fire arrows, 64,000 bow strings, and hundreds of transport carts.

Military crossbows were armed by treading, or basically placing the feet on the bow stave and drawing it using one's arms and back muscles. During the Song dynasty, stirrups were added for ease of drawing and to mitigate damage to the bow. Alternatively the bow could also be drawn by a belt claw attached to the waist, but this was done lying down, as was the case for all large crossbows. Winch-drawing was used for the large mounted crossbows as seen below, but evidence for its use in Chinese hand-crossbows is scant.

Advantages and disadvantages

The crossbow allowed archers to shoot bows of greater strength and more accurately as well due to its greater stability, but at the cost of speed.

In 169 BC, Chao Cuo observed that by using the crossbow, it was possible to overcome the Xiongnu:

The Wujing Zongyao states that the crossbow used en masse was the most effective weapon against northern nomadic cavalry charges. Even if they failed, the quarrels were too short to be used as regular arrows so they couldn't be used again by nomadic archers after the battle. The crossbow's role as an anti-cavalry weapon was later reaffirmed in Medieval Europe when Thomas the Archdeacon recommended them as the optimal weapon against the Mongols. Elite crossbowmen were used to pick off targets as was the case when the Liao Dynasty general Xiao Talin was picked off by a Song crossbowman at the Battle of Shanzhou in 1004.

Repeating crossbow

According to the Wu-Yue Chunqiu (history of the Wu-Yue War), written in the Eastern Han dynasty, the repeating crossbow was invented during the Warring States Period by a Mr. Qin from the State of Chu. This is corroborated by the earliest archaeological evidence of repeating crossbows, which was excavated from a Chu burial site at Tomb 47 at Qinjiazui, Hubei Province, and has been dated to the 4th century BC, during the Warring States Period (475 – 220 BC). Unlike repeating crossbows of later eras, the ancient double shot repeating crossbow uses a pistol grip and a rear pulling mechanism for arming. The Ming repeating crossbow uses an arming mechanism which requires its user to push a rear lever upwards and downwards back and forth. Although hand held repeating crossbows were generally weak and required additional poison, probably aconite, for lethality, much larger mounted versions appeared during the Ming dynasty.

In 180 AD, Yang Xuan used a type of repeating crossbow powered by the movement of wheels:

Although the invention of the repeating crossbow has often been attributed to Zhuge Liang, he in fact had nothing to do with it. This misconception is based on a record attributing improvements to the multiple bolt crossbows to him.

During the Ming dynasty, repeating crossbows were used on ships.

Repeating crossbows continued in use until the late Qing dynasty when it became obvious they could not longer compete with firearms.

Mounted crossbow

Large mounted crossbows known as "bed crossbows" were used as early as the Warring States period. Mozi described them as defensive weapons placed on top of the battlements. The Mohist siege crossbow was described as humongous device with frameworks taller than a man and shooting arrows with cords attached so that they could be pulled back. By the Han dynasty, crossbows were used as mobile field artillery and known as "Military Strong Carts". Around the 5th century AD, multiple bows were combined to increase draw weight and length, thus creating the double and triple bow crossbows. Tang versions of this weapon are stated to have obtained a range of 1,160 yards, which is supported by Ata-Malik Juvayni on the use of similar weapons by the Mongols in 1256. According Juvayni, Hulagu Khan brought with him 3,000 giant crossbows from China, for the siege of Nishapur, and a team of Chinese technicians to work a great 'ox bow' shooting large bolts a distance of 2,500 paces, which was used at the siege of Maymun Diz. According to the Wujing Zongyao, these weapons had a range of 450 meters while other Song sources give ranges of more than double or even triple that. Constructing these weapons, especially the casting of the large triggers, and their operation required the highest order of technical expertise available at the time. They were primarily used from the 8th to 11th centuries.

Joseph Needham on the range of the triple-bow crossbow:

However, Juwaini's description of the campaign against the Nizaris contains many exaggerations due to his bias against the Nizari Ismailis, and Maimun-Diz was actually not as impregnable as other nearby castles as Alamut and Lamasar, according to Peter Wiley.

Multiple bolt crossbow

The multiple bolt crossbow appeared around the late 4th century BC. A passage dated to 320 BC states that it was mounted on a three-wheeled carriage and stationed on the ramparts. The crossbow was drawn using a treadle and shot 10-foot long arrows. Other drawing mechanisms such as winches and oxen were also used. Later on pedal release triggers were also used. Although this weapon was able to discharge multiple bolts, it was at the cost of reduced accuracy since the further the arrow was from the center of the bow string, the more off center its trajectory would be. It had a maximum range of 500 yards.

When Qin Shi Huang's magicians failed to get in touch with "spirits and immortals of the marvellous islands of the Eastern Sea", they excused themselves by saying large monsters blocked their way. Qin Shi Huang personally went out with a multiple bolt crossbow to see these monsters for himself. He found no monsters but killed a big fish.

In 99 BC, they were used as field artillery against attacking nomadic cavalry.

Although Zhuge Liang is often credited with the invention of the repeating crossbow, this is actually due to a mistranslation confusing it with the multiple bolt crossbow. The source actually says Zhuge invented a multiple bolt crossbow that could shoot ten iron bolts simultaneously, each 20 cm long.

In 759 AD, Li Quan described a type of multiple bolt crossbow capable of destroying ramparts and city towers:

In 950 AD, Tao Gu described multiple crossbows connected by a single trigger:

The weapon was considered obsolete by 1530.

Countermarch

The concept of continuous and concerted rotating fire, the countermarch, may have been implemented using crossbows as early as the Han dynasty, but it was not until the Tang dynasty that illustrations of the countermarch appeared. The 759 CE text, Tai bai yin jing (太白陰經) by Tang military official Li Quan (李筌), contains the oldest known depiction and description of the volley fire technique. The illustration shows a rectangular crossbow formation with each circle representing one man. In the front is a line labeled "shooting crossbows" (發弩) and behind that line are rows of crossbowmen, two facing right and two facing left, and they are labeled "loading crossbows" (張弩). The commander (大將軍) is situated in the middle of the formation and to his right and left are vertical rows of drummers (鼓) who coordinate the firing and reloading procedure in procession: who loaded their weapons, stepped forward to the outer ranks, shot, and then retired to reload. According to Li Quan, "the classics say that the crossbow is fury. It is said that its noise is so powerful that it sounds like fury, and that's why they named it this way," and by using the volley fire method there is no end to the sound and fury, and the enemy is unable to approach. Here he is referring to the word for "crossbow" nu which is also a homophone for the word for fury, nu.

The encyclopedic text known as the Tongdian by Du You from 801 CE also provides a description of the volley fire technique: "[Crossbow units] should be divided into teams that can concentrate their arrow shooting.… Those in the center of the formations should load [their bows] while those on the outside of the formations should shoot. They take turns, revolving and returning, so that once they've loaded they exit [i.e., proceed to the outer ranks] and once they've shot they enter [i.e., go within the formations]. In this way, the sound of the crossbow will not cease and the enemy will not harm us."

The Wujing Zongyao, written during the Song dynasty, notes that during the Tang period, crossbows were not used to their full effectiveness due to the fear of cavalry charges. The author's solution was to drill the soldiers to the point where rather than hide behind shieldbearers upon the approach of enemy soldier, they would "plant the feet like a firm mountain, and, unmoving at the front of the battle arrays, shoot thickly to the middle [of the enemy], and none among them will not fall down dead." The Song volley fire formation was described thus: "Those in the center of the formation should load while those on the outside of the formation should shoot, and when [the enemy gets] close, then they should shelter themselves with small shields [literally side shields, 旁牌], each taking turns and returning, so that those who are loading are within the formation. In this way the crossbows will not cease sounding." In addition to the Tang formation, the Song illustration also added a new label to the middle line of crossbowmen between the firing and reloading lines, known as the "advancing crossbows." Both Tang and Song manuals also made aware to the reader that "the accumulated arrows should be shot in a stream, which means that in front of them there must be no standing troops, and across [from them] no horizontal formations."

The volley fire technique was used to great effect by the Song during the Jin-Song Wars. In the fall of 1131 the Jin commander Wuzhu (兀朮) invaded the Shaanxi region but was defeated by general Wu Jie (吳 玠) and his younger brother Wu Lin (吳璘). The History of Song elaborates on the battle in detail:

After losing half his army Wuzhu escaped back to the north, only to invade again in the following year. Again, he was defeated while trying to breach a strategic pass. The History of Song states that during the battle Wu Jie's brother Wu Lin "used the Standing-Firm Arrow Teams, who shot alternately, and the arrows fell like rain, and the dead piled up in layers, but the enemy climbed over them and kept climbing up." This passage is especially noteworthy for its mention of a special technique being utilized as it is one of the very few times that the History of Song has elaborated on a specific tactic.

Southeast Asia

There is another theory pointing towards an independent Southeast Asian origin for the crossbow based on linguistic evidence:

Around the third century BC, King An Dương of Âu Lạc (modern-day northern Vietnam) and (modern-day southern China) commissioned a man named Cao Lỗ (or Cao Thông) to construct a crossbow and christened it "Saintly Crossbow of the Supernaturally Luminous Golden Claw" (nỏ thần), which one shot could killed 300 men. According to historian Keith Taylor, the crossbow, along with the word for it, seems to have been introduced into China from Austroasiatic peoples in the south around the fourth century BC. However, this is contradicted by crossbow locks found in ancient Chinese Zhou Dynasty tombs dating to the 600s BC.  

In 315 AD, Nu Wen taught the Chams how to build fortifications and use crossbows. The Chams would later give the Chinese crossbows as presents on at least one occasion.

Siege crossbows were transmitted to the Chams by Zhi Yangjun, who was shipwrecked on their coast in 1172. He remained there and taught them mounted archery and how to use siege crossbows. In 1177 crossbows were used by the Champa in their invasion and sacking of Angkor, the Khmer Empire's capital. The Khmer also had double bow crossbows mounted on elephants, which Michel JacqHergoualc’h suggest were elements of Cham mercenaries in Jayavarman VII's army.

Europe

Ancient

Greece
The earliest crossbow-like weapons in Europe probably emerged around the late 5th century BC when the gastraphetes, an ancient Greek crossbow, appeared. The device was described by the Greco-Roman author Heron of Alexandria of Roman Egypt in his Belopoeica ("On Catapult-making"), which draws on an earlier account of Greek engineer Ctesibius (fl. 285–222 BC) of Ptolemaic Egypt. According to Heron, the gastraphetes was the forerunner of the later catapult, which places its invention some unknown time prior to 399 BC during Classical Greece. The gastraphetes was a crossbow mounted on a stock divided into a lower and upper section. The lower was a case fixed to the bow while the upper was a slider which had the same dimensions as the case. Meaning "belly-bow", it was called as such because the concave withdrawal rest at one end of the stock was placed against the stomach of the operator, which he could press to withdraw the slider before attaching a string to the trigger and loading the bolt; this could thus store more energy than regular Greek bows. It was used in the Siege of Motya in 397 BC. This was a key Carthaginian stronghold in Sicily, as described in the 1st century AD by Heron of Alexandria in his book Belopoeica.

Other arrow shooting machines such as the larger ballista and smaller Scorpio also existed starting from around 338 BC, but these are torsion catapults and not considered crossbows. Arrow-shooting machines (katapeltai) are briefly mentioned by Aeneas Tacticus in his treatise on siegecraft written around 350 BC. An Athenian inventory from 330 to 329 BC includes catapults bolts with heads and flights. Arrow-shooting machines in action are reported from Philip II's siege of Perinthos in Thrace in 340 BC. At the same time, Greek fortifications began to feature high towers with shuttered windows in the top, presumably to house anti-personnel arrow shooters, as in Aigosthena.

Rome

The late 4th century Roman author Vegetius provides the only contemporary account of ancient Roman crossbows. In his De Re Militaris, he describes arcubalistarii (crossbowmen) working together with archers and artillerymen. However it is disputed if arcuballistas were even crossbows or just more torsion powered weapons. The idea that the arcuballista was a crossbow is based on the fact that Vegetius refers to it and the manuballista, which was torsion powered, separately. Therefore, if the arcuballista was not like the manuballista, it may have been a crossbow. Some suggest it was the other way around and manuballistas were crossbows. The etymology is not clear and their definitions obscure. Some historians believe neither the arcuballista or manuballista were crossbows. According to Vegetius, these were well known devices, and as such didn't make the effort to describe them in depth.

Arrian's earlier Ars Tactica, written around 136 AD, does mention 'missiles shot not from a bow but from a machine' and that this machine was used on horseback while in full gallop. It's presumed that this was a crossbow.

The only pictorial evidence of Roman arcuballistas comes from sculptural reliefs in Roman Gaul depicting them in hunting scenes. The draw-length of the crossbow depicted is longer than later medieval crossbows and more similar to Greek and Chinese crossbows, but it's not clear what kind of release mechanism they used. Archaeological evidence suggests they were based on the rolling nut mechanism of medieval Europe.

Medieval

References to the crossbow are basically nonexistent in Europe from the 5th century until the 10th century. It's argued that the term solenarion, found in the Strategikon of Maurice, refers to a crossbow. This is disputed by other historians who interpret "the device in question as an arrow guide." There is however a depiction of a crossbow as a hunting weapon on four Pictish stones from early medieval Scotland (6th to 9th centuries): St. Vigeans no. 1, Glenferness, Shandwick, and Meigle.

The crossbow reappeared again in 947 as a French weapon during the siege of Senlis and again in 984 at the siege of Verdun. They were used at the battle of Hastings in 1066 and had by the 12th century become a common battlefield weapon. The earliest remains of a European crossbow to date were found at Lake Paladru and has been dated to the 11th century.

Crossbows are not mentioned in Byzantine sources until the 11th century. Some believe that the toxoballistra found in Middle Byzantine sources refer to a crossbow, but the evidence is inconclusive. According to Anna Komnene (1083–1153), the crossbow was a new weapon associated with barbarians and was not known to the Greeks:

The first medieval European crossbows were made of wood, usually yew or olive wood. Composite lath crossbows began to appear around the end of the 12th century and crossbows with steel laths emerged in the 1300s. Crossbows with steel laths were sometimes referred to as arbalests. These had much higher draw weights than composite bows and required mechanical aids such as the cranequin or windlass for spanning. Usually these could only shoot two bolts per minute versus twelve or more with a skilled archer, often necessitating the use of a pavise to protect the operator from enemy fire. Despite the appearance of stronger bows, wooden laths remained popular into the 1400s due to being less sensitive to the water and cold.

The crossbow superseded hand bows in many European armies during the 12th century, except in England, where the longbow was more popular.  Along with polearm weapons made from farming equipment, the crossbow was also a weapon of choice for insurgent peasants such as the Taborites. Genoese crossbowmen, recruited in Genoa and in different parts of northern Italy, were famous mercenaries hired throughout medieval Europe, while the crossbow also played an important role in anti-personnel defense of ships. Some 4,000 crossbowmen joined the Fifth Crusade and 5,000 under Louis IX of France during the Seventh Crusade.

Crossbowmen occupied a high status as professional soldiers and often earned higher pay than other foot soldiers. The rank of the commanding officer of crossbowmen corps was one of the highest positions in many medieval armies, including those of Spain, France, and Italy. Crossbowmen were held in such high regard in Spain that they were granted status on par with the knightly class.

The payment for a crossbow mercenary was higher than for a longbow mercenary, but the longbowman did not have to pay a team of assistants and his equipment was cheaper. Thus the crossbow team was twelve percent less efficient than the longbowman since three of the latter could be part of the army in place of one crossbow team. Furthermore, the prod and bow string of a composite crossbow were subject to damage in rain whereas the longbowman could simply unstring his bow to protect the string. French forces employing the composite crossbow were outmatched by English longbowmen at Crécy in 1346, at Poitiers in 1356 and at Agincourt in 1415. As a result, use of the crossbow declined sharply in France, and the French authorities made attempts to train longbowmen of their own. After the conclusion of the Hundred Years' War, however, the French largely abandoned the use of the longbow, and consequently the military crossbow saw a resurgence in popularity. The crossbow continued to see use in French armies by both infantry and mounted troops until as late as 1520 when, as with elsewhere in continental Europe, the crossbow would be largely eclipsed by the handgun. Spanish forces in the New World would make extensive use of the crossbow, even after it had largely fallen out of use in Europe.  Crossbowmen participated in Hernán Cortés' conquest of the Aztec Empire and accompanied Francisco Pizarro on his initial expedition to Peru, though by the time of the conquest of Inca Empire in 1532-1523 he would have only a dozen such men remaining in his service.

Chinese and European crossbows in comparison

This was made possible by the more compact design of the Chinese trigger, which allowed it to sit further back at the rear-end of the tiller. The longer horizontal lever on European crossbows necessitated placing it much further forward. Longer Chinese power strokes were also made possible by the relatively short Chinese composite bow, which could be drawn further back without fear of breaking.

When Europeans began fielding crossbows on battlefields in earnest during the 10th century AD, not only were the triggers more cumbersome, the bows were made of wood. However, by the 13th century European crossbows began transitioning to composite bows as well, increasing their draw weight. While still utilizing the rolling nut mechanism, 13th century European composite crossbows were probably not much worse compared to the Chinese crossbow, if at all, in terms of draw-weight. From the 13th century onward, European crossbows made use of spanning mechanisms not seen in China such as the pulley, gaffle, cranequin, and screw. Furthermore, 14th century European crossbows could be made of steel, increasing their draw weights beyond even the heaviest Chinese infantry crossbow. These were accompanied by the cord pulley spanning device. However, the power stroke of the European crossbows remained much lower than that of Chinese crossbows (typically one third of the powerstroke), which limited their power despite increasing draw weights.

For example, a  draw crossbow with an  powerstroke can shoot a 400 grain arrow at 205 fps, while a 150-pound draw crossbow with a  powerstroke can shoot a 400 grain arrow at 235 fps. This translates into a 14.6% increase in power for every 9% increase in powerstroke. Thus, if other factors are equal, a standard Han Dynasty crossbow with a ≈ draw weight and a  powerstroke would have comparable levels of power to a medieval European crossbow with a  draw weight and a  powerstroke.

European crossbows were phased out in the 16th century in favor of arquebuses and muskets. In China, the crossbow was not considered a serious military weapon by the end of the late Ming dynasty, but continued to see limited usage into the 19th century.

Japan
Oyumi were ancient Japanese artillery pieces that first appeared in the seventh century (during the Asuka Period). According to Japanese records, the Oyumi was different from the hand held crossbow also in use during the same time period. A quote from a seventh-century source seems to suggest that the Oyumi may have able to fire multiple arrows at once: "the Oyumi were lined up and fired at random, the arrows fell like rain". A ninth century Japanese artisan named Shimaki no Fubito claimed to have improved on a version of the weapon used by the Chinese; his version could rotate and fire projectiles in multiple directions. The last recorded use of the Oyumi was in 1189.

Islamic world

There are no references to crossbows in Islamic texts earlier than the 14th century. Arabs in general were averse to the crossbow and considered it a foreign weapon. They called it qaus al-rijl (foot-drawn bow), qaus al-zanbūrak (bolt bow) and qaus al-faranjīyah (Frankish bow). Although Muslims did have crossbows, there seems to be a split between eastern and western types. Muslims in Spain used the typical European trigger while eastern Muslim crossbows had a more complex trigger mechanism.

Mamluk cavalry used crossbows.

Africa and South America 
In Central Africa simple crossbows were used for hunting and as a scout weapon, previously thought to have been first introduced by the Portuguese. Until recently they were especially in use by different tribes of the pygmy-people, usually with poisoned and relatively small arrows. This silent technique of hunting in the tropical forest is quite similar to that of the South American indigenous hunting method with blow pipe and poisoned arrows. It makes sure not to startle up the prey, for example if a first shot goes astray. Since the small arrow is rarely deadly itself, the animal will drop from the trees after some time because of the poisoning.
In the American South, the crossbow was used by the conquistadors for hunting and warfare when firearms or gunpowder were unavailable because of economic hardships or isolation.

Use of crossbows today 

Crossbows today are mostly used for target shooting in modern archery. In some countries they are still used for hunting, such as in most of states within the US, parts of Asia, Europe, Australia and Africa. Crossbows with special projectiles are used in whale research to take blubber biopsy samples without harming the whales or other marine big "game" .

Modern military and paramilitary usage
Crossbows were eventually replaced in warfare by gunpowder weapons, although early guns had slower rates of fire and much worse accuracy than contemporary crossbows. The Battle of Cerignola in 1503 was largely won by Spain through the use of matchlock firearms, marking the first time a major battle was won through the use of firearms. Later, similar competing tactics would feature harquebusiers or musketeers in formation with pikemen, pitted against cavalry firing pistols or carbines. While the military crossbow had largely been supplanted by firearms on the battlefield by 1525, the sporting crossbow in various forms remained a popular hunting weapon in Europe until the eighteenth century.

A bomb-throwing crossbow called the Sauterelle was used by the French and British armies on the Western Front during World War I. It could throw an F1 grenade or Mills bomb .

The crossbow is still used in modern times by various militaries, tribal forces and in China even by the police forces. As their worldwide distribution is not restricted by regulations on arms, they are used as silent weapons and for their psychological effect, even reportedly using poisoned projectiles. Crossbows are used for ambush and anti-sniper operations or in conjunction with ropes to establish zip-lines in difficult terrain.

See also 
Hymn to the Fallen (Jiu Ge)
 Medieval warfare
Panjagan, a possible crossbow type Sasanian weapon

References

Sources

Further reading 

Crossbows
Crossbows
Crossbows